Jo Ann Castle (born September 3, 1939) is an American honky-tonk pianist, best remembered for appearing on The Lawrence Welk Show. She adopted her stage name from the name of an accordion manufacturer, another instrument she played proficiently. She was often referred to as "Queen of the Honky-Tonk Piano" by Lawrence Welk himself.

Originally introduced to Welk by Joe Feeney in 1959, Castle became a permanent member of the Welk Family, replacing the departing Big Tiny Little. Shortly after joining the Show, Castle married cameraman Dean Hall. They divorced in 1966 after having a daughter. Castle married again in 1968 and had a son and a daughter. Castle left the Welk Show in 1969 and divorced in 1971. Her third marriage, in 1978, ended in 1986.

In the 1990s, Castle performed at the Welk-owned Champagne Theater in Branson, Missouri, as well as making a guest appearance for a show with Jimmy Sturr and His Orchestra on RFD TV.

On September 3, 2011, Castle married her fourth husband, Lin Biviano, a trumpet player from Boston.

Discography

References

1939 births
American pop pianists
Living people
Musicians from Bakersfield, California
American accordionists
Lawrence Welk
20th-century American pianists
21st-century accordionists
Women accordionists
20th-century American women pianists
21st-century American women musicians